Sonic Soul Surfer is the seventh studio album by American blues musician Seasick Steve. It is the follow-up of his previous album Hubcap Music in 2013. It was released on 23 March 2015 worldwide. Three singles were released from the album : "Bring It On" was the lead single on 25 November 2014, "Summertime Boy" was the album's second single on 10 February 2015, and music video was shot, featuring Seasick Steve surfing. Another single and music video were released on 12 April 2015 : the album's opening track "Roy's Gang". A "Sonic Soul Tour" started in April 2015, with concerts in the US, and across Europe.

The album was his most acclaimed to date by critics, with an average score of 70/100 according to Metacritic. It also was a commercial success, peaking at number 4 on the UK and Scottish Albums Chart, 16 in the Netherlands, 17 in Belgium, 25 in Ireland, and 64 in Australia, its best peak since his 2009 album Man From Another Time. It has been certified gold.

Critical reception

Sonic Soul Surfer received critical acclaim, receiving an average score of 70/100 on Metacritic, based on nine critics.

Mojo gave the album four out of five stars, stating "Sonic Soul Surfer mostly trades in toe-tapping slide-guitar riffage". Q magazine also rewarded the album with four out of five stars. The website "The Metropolist" rewarded the album with three out of five stars, picking lead single "Bring It On" as a "stand-out on Sonic Soul Surfer", but criticizing "Roy's Gang" as "falling a bit flat".

Calum Slingerland of Exclaim! acknowledged that the record was more about lateral movement as opposed to breaking new musical ground, writing that Sonic Soul Surfer "reassures listeners that the California native's desire to write and play is still very much alive."

French website Stillinrock also gave a positive review of the record, but however criticized it in these words : "it's a fact : Sonic Soul Surfer won't be a rock'n'roll revolution. However, only a few musicians dare playing this kind of music [...]. If "powerful" is the word that comes to our mind when we think of Sonic Soul Surfer, it might be because Steve is an artist that lies neither to himself nor to his audience".

Track listing

Charts and certifications

Weekly charts

Year-end charts

Certifications

References

External links
Official website

2015 albums
Seasick Steve albums